Medicine Voice is Sar Friedman from Sydney.

Sar Friedman has been singing, recording and touring in various bands and experimental groups for over a decade – most notably serving time in Stephen McBean's Black Mountain (band) offshoot Pink Mountaintops, Leopard Leg, Melodie Nelson and known also for her solo work under the name of Heartswin.  Friedman recruited Oren Ambarchi and Joe Talia for her debut solo record as Medicine Voice.

Discography

Albums
I And Thou (Provenance, 2016)

Critical response

Medicine Voice was cited in The Guardian in July 2016, described as having a "cool, clear and ultra-present voice" with "mantra-like repetitions". Australian web site Happy described her debut album as "a shamanic, transcendental debut", and Brisbane independent radio station 4ZZZ noted that she was "accurately compared to Cat Power, Bat For Lashes and especially PJ Harvey" and that "a subtle menace underwrites the reverberant ambience."

References

External links
Medicine Voice on Provenance

Year of birth missing (living people)
Living people
Australian women singers